Yves Marie Baudrier (11 February 1906 –  9 November 1988) was a French composer. Along with André Jolivet, Olivier Messiaen and Jean-Yves Daniel-Lesur, he was a founder of the La jeune France group of composers.

He also competed in the mixed 6 metres at the 1936 Summer Olympics and in the music competition at the 1948 Summer Olympics.

Selected filmography
 Dilemma of Two Angels (1948)
 The Man Who Returns from Afar (1950)
 The Glass Castle (1950)
 The Night Is My Kingdom (1951)
 The Seven Deadly Sins (1952)

References

Bibliography
 Peter Bondanella: The Films of Roberto Rossellini (Cambridge: Cambridge University Press, 1993).

External links

1906 births
1988 deaths
20th-century classical composers
20th-century French composers
French classical composers
French film score composers
French male sailors (sport)
Olympic competitors in art competitions
Olympic sailors of France
Musicians from Paris
Sailors at the 1936 Summer Olympics – 6 Metre
Sportspeople from Paris